Primary Wave is a private music publishing and talent management company.  Primary Wave was founded in January 2006 by music executive Lawrence Mestel. Since its origin as a music publishing company, Primary Wave has expanded into talent management, film and TV production, digital marketing, and branding.

History

2006–2015: Early years
Primary Wave Music Publishing was founded in 2006 after an introduction of Courtney Love to founder Lawrence Mestel, resulted in the purchase of 50% of Kurt Cobain's portion of the Nirvana catalog. The Nirvana purchase would eventually galvanize Primary Wave's acquisitions of Chicago, Albert Hammond Jr., Bo Diddley, Steven Tyler, John Lennon, Lamont Dozier, Hall & Oates, Def Leppard, and Maurice White's (of Earth, Wind & Fire) publishing catalogs.

In September 2013, Primary Wave and BMG Rights Management formed a joint venture for $150 million, with BMG buying a majority of Primary Wave's publishing, including "I Want to Hold Your Hand" by The Beatles, "Kiss on My List" by Hall & Oates, "How Sweet It Is" by Marvin Gaye, and "September" by Earth, Wind & Fire. The joint venture ended in 2016, though BMG kept the catalogues that it acquired from Primary Wave.

2016–present: Acquisitions
Currently one of the largest indie music publishers in the United States, Primary Wave markets the copyrights of over 15,000 songs from the catalogs of various artists and songwriters.

The platform for a second phase of expansion was established in 2016, when Primary Wave received $300 million of funding from multiple large institutional investors, forming Primary Wave's first music based fund. Primary Wave then purchased Smokey Robinson's catalogue for $25 million.

By 2017, Primary Wave acquired a stake in Rough Trade Publishing for $5 million and music catalogs such as Steve Cropper, Tom Cochrane, and Holly Knight. Later that year in August, Primary Wave acquired publishing and master royalties from Glenn Gould, a Canadian 20th-century classical pianist.

In January 2018, Primary Wave acquired an 80 percent share in Chris Blackwell's Blue Mountain Music, one of the largest independent publishers, which included the rights to Bob Marley. The Blue Mountain Music acquisition also includes songs by Toots and the Maytals, Free, Burning Spear, Steel Pulse, and Marianne Faithfull. That same month, Primary Wave closed a marketing and publishing administration deal with Alice Cooper. In May 2019, Primary Wave closed a reported multi-million-dollar deal with British band Culture Club, led by front man Boy George. The acquisition included a portion of the band's publishing and master recording income stream.

Primary Wave announced an investment into Lava Media Group in September 2020. The new business relationship includes marketing and brand support from Primary Wave to support Lava's podcasts and also gives them access to Primary Wave's roster of talent. In November 2020, the Los Angeles Chapter of the Association of Independent Music Publishers (AIMP) announced Primary Wave as the recipient of its 2020 Indie Publisher of the Year award.

On January 28, 2021, Primary Wave acquired the catalogue of the rock and roll label Sun Records for $30 million, including recordings by Johnny Cash, Carl Perkins, and Jerry Lee Lewis. In August 2021, Primary Wave acquired a stake in Prince's music assets which include royalty streams from the songs "When You Were Mine", "I Wanna Be Your Lover", "1999", "Little Red Corvette" and "When Doves Cry".

Divisions

References

External links 
 

Music publishing companies of the United States
Kurt Cobain
Publishing companies established in 2006
American companies established in 2006